The November 2009 Rawalpindi bombing was a suicide attack carried out in front of the Mall Road branch of National Bank of Pakistan in Rawalpindi, Pakistan. The blast area was considered to be a very safe and high security place. Tehrik-i-Taliban was blamed for this deadly blast, which occurred when Pakistan government announced £3m in rewards for the capture of the Taliban leadership.

Blast

The blast occurred when an alleged suicide bomber riding a motorcycle blew up himself outside the door of a local bank near Shalimar Hotel behind the Pearl Continental Hotel, which is also a commercial area.

A witness to the blast said, "We were sitting on the second floor of our office. It was a huge blast, Our building shook as if in an earthquake and when we came out there was smoke everywhere and body parts were thrown into our office."

Rescue teams arrived on the blast area and an emergency was declared in major hospitals. Many education institutions were closed in the city and high security deployed in the sensitive areas.

Reaction 
The blast provoked condemnations from President Asif Ali Zardari, Prime Minister Yousaf Raza Gillani, and many religious leaders and local politicians.

See also
List of terrorist incidents in Pakistan since 2001
List of terrorist incidents, 2009
 December 2009 Rawalpindi attack

References 

21st-century mass murder in Pakistan
Mass murder in 2009
Terrorist incidents in Pakistan in 2009
Suicide bombings in Pakistan
Crime in Punjab, Pakistan
Terrorist incidents in Rawalpindi
History of Rawalpindi
Attacks on buildings and structures in Pakistan
Building bombings in Pakistan